were a Japanese psychedelic band founded in Tokyo. The band's name translates to "geometric patterns."

Name 
Kikagaku Moyo (in Japanese Kanji 幾何学模様, transliterated Kikagaku Moyō) translates to “geometric patterns”, which the drummer Go Kurosawa suggested as a band name after getting visuals caused by sleep deprivation during a long jam session at night. In a 2014 interview with the It’s Psychedelic Baby! magazine, Go recalls the moment at which he came up with the name: “It means geometric patterns, which I saw on the back of my eyelids after jamming all night long. I was totally in the “zone”, half awake and half asleep, but my hands were tapping the drums involuntarily. Tomo and I both wanted to have a Japanese name with Kanji characters, so it was decided pretty quickly.”.

History
In the summer of 2012 in Tokyo, Go Kurosawa - who came to be the drummer in what would become Kikagaku Moyo - met Tomo Katsurada - the future guitarist - who had come back from studying film in the US. Having similar interests in music, fashion and movies, they decided to start playing music together. Though Go had played piano and Tomo knew the cello, both of them had little to no prior experience in the instruments they wanted to play in the band. Initially, the two often played together in an old studio where their friend worked, from midnight to morning, the reason for that being the high price of playing in the studio during the day. 

Dissatisfied with their sound, Go and Tomo soon went out to search for more people to join the band. They specifically sought people who didn’t have much experience like Go and Tomo themselves, but wanted to play music together. They started with putting up signs and handing out posters at their college. They eventually met their bassist Kotsoguy who was recording sounds from a vending machine on the street for a drone project. Tomo met their second guitarist Daoud Popal in a smoking area at the college Go and Tomo were attending. Around the same time, the band’s sitarist Ryu Kurosawa, who is Go's brother, joined the band after coming back from India. The members didn’t have much in common when it comes to musical taste. Go had a mixed music taste and was the only one listening to psychedelic rock while Tomo preferred power pop, Kotsoguy black metal and Daoud hip-hop. In an interview, Go says “We tried to talk, “What have you been listening to?” We could never share anything. So only after we started playing, after one year, we started sharing.”. Since most of the members weren’t technically proficient, they decided to adopt a psychedelic, meditative style, as a utilitarian approach to play music together. This style is especially present on their self-titled debut album.

Kikagaku Moyo did not find any great success in Japan, one reason for that being the expensive live shows, since Japanese music venues have a system of charging bands instead of paying them for live shows. According to Go Kurosawa in an interview, bands have to pay around 300$ for a 30-35 minute show. Therefore, the band started busking on Tokyo streets, outside of busy train stations. The group also made an attempt to set up psyche festivals around Tokyo, charging about five dollars for entry, with the aim of providing a cheap and accessible music scene. The band did however not gain any major progress either way. In an interview, Go says “[In Japan,] most people don’t like this kind of thing, they like following the rules”. Furthermore, the crowds were mostly made up of foreigners. This inspired the group to go abroad: their first tour took place in America where they played the Levitation festival in 2014.

Their second LP "Forest of Lost Children" was released on May 20, 2014 by Beyond Beyond is Beyond Records based in Brooklyn, New York. They toured the U.S. in April 2014 in support of the record with appearances at Desert Daze Austin Psych Fest Due to high demand their S/T record was reissued on Cassette tape by Burger Records and a new tape by the name of "Mammatus Clouds" was released on the eclectic Sky Lantern Records in Tucson, Arizona. "Mammatus Clouds" was pressed onto 12" LP by both Cardinal Fuzz Records (UK) and Captcha Records (US) in June 2014. The band continued to tour throughout 2014 and made their first appearance in the UK that October selling out several shows in London.

In 2015 the band toured extensively through Europe with appearances at Eindhoven Psych Lab and Duna Jam. Members of the band also started the record label Guruguru brain in 2015 to showcase the unique music scene in East Asia. They would release their next two records on it: House in the Tall Grass, released in May 2016, and Masana Temples, released in October 2018.

In 2017, they played a string of Gizzfest shows in Australia alongside friends King Gizzard & the Lizard Wizard, The Murlocs, La Luz, O.R.B and Parsnip.
The band visited Australia a second time in March 2020 and played a small boutique festival 'Nine Lives' hosted by local record store Jet Black Cat Music.

On 19 January 2022, the band announced they would go on an indefinite hiatus after 2022, and that their next record would be their last. Titled Kumoyo Island, the album was released in May 2022.

Kikagaku Moyo played their last show December 3, 2022 at Meguro Persimmonn Hall in Tokyo.

Band Members

Final lineup
 Go Kurosawa - vocals, drums, percussion, guitar, flute/recorder
 Tomo Katsurada - vocals, guitar, percussion, cello
 Kotsu Guy - bass guitar, occasional rhythm guitar
 Daoud Popal - guitar, percussion, occasional drums
 Ryu Kurosawa - sitar, keyboards, synthesizers, piano, organ

Former
 Angie Gotopo - vocals, theremin

Discography
Studio albums
Kikagaku Moyo (2013, Cosmic Eye/Sound effect/Guruguru Brain)
Forest of Lost Children (2014, Beyond Beyond is Beyond)
House in the Tall Grass (2016, Guruguru Brain)
Masana Temples (2018, Guruguru Brain)
Kumoyo Island (2022, Guruguru Brain)

Live albums
Live at Levitation (2021, Reverberation Appreciation Society)

EPs
Mammatus Clouds (2014, Sky Lantern/Captcha/Cardinal Fuzz)
Stone Garden (2017, Guruguru Brain)
Deep Fried Grandeur (2021, Husky Pants Records) with Ryley Walker

Singles
"Flujo y Reflujo" split with Kinski and Kawabata (2015, God Unknown)
"Spinning Wheel" split with Moon Duo (2015, Jean Sandwich)
"Gypsy Davey" / "Mushi No Uta" (2020, Sub Pop)
"Ouchi Time" (2020, Looking Glass/Mexican Summer)

References

External links 

 Official website 
 Guruguru Brain on BandCamp

Japanese psychedelic rock music groups
Musical groups from Tokyo
Musical groups established in 2012
2012 establishments in Japan